New Roads High School may refer to:

New Roads High School (California), Santa Monica, California
Rosenwald High School (New Roads, Louisiana), formerly New Roads High School